Sasereme Airport  is an airport in Sasereme, in the Western Province of Papua New Guinea.

Airlines and destinations

References

Airports in Papua New Guinea
Western Province (Papua New Guinea)